Transtillaspis emblema is a species of moth of the family Tortricidae. It is found in Napo Province, Ecuador.

The wingspan is 13.5–15 mm for males and 14–16 mm for females. The ground colour of the forewings is whitish, suffused and strigulated (finely streaked) with grey brown. The hindwings are dark brown.

Etymology
The species name refers to the nice appearance of the species and is derived from Latin emblema (meaning adornment).

References

Moths described in 2005
Transtillaspis
Moths of South America
Taxa named by Józef Razowski